Beautiful Justice is a Philippine television drama action crime series broadcast by GMA Network. Directed by Mark A. Reyes V, it stars Yasmien Kurdi, Gabbi Garcia, and Bea Binene. It premiered on September 9, 2019, on the network's Telebabad line up replacing Sahaya. The series concluded on January 24, 2020, with a total of 100 episodes. It was replaced by Anak ni Waray vs. Anak ni Biday in its timeslot.

The series is streaming online on YouTube.

Premise
The lives of Alice, Brie and Kitkat will change when their loved ones who are Philippine Drug Enforcement Agency agents get involved in a bloody operation, leading them three to get close to each other and look for justice.

Cast and characters

Lead cast
 Yasmien Kurdi as Alicia "Alice" Santos-Vida
 Gabbi Garcia as Sabrina "Brie" Cuevas-Ocampo
 Bea Binene as Katrina "Kitkat" Bernardo

Supporting cast
 Gil Cuerva as Vincent "Vin" Ocampo
 Derrick Monasterio as Lance Decena / Brutus
 Victor Neri as Antonio "Tony" Bautista
 Valeen Montenegro as Miranda "Lady M" Samonte / Red Lotus
 Bing Loyzaga as Charmaine “Ninang” Tan / Chantal Cuevas
 Ian de Leon as Roman Bernardo
 Lilet as Marilen Bernardo
 Shyr Valdez as Ellen Vida
 Therese Malvar as Hershey Bernardo
 Phillip Lazaro as Queena

Guest cast
 Carlos Agassi as Adam Balagtas
 Vincent Magbanua as Dennis Bernardo
 Gabby Eigenmann as Ronnie Vida
 Kiel Rodriguez as an agent
 Kevin Santos as Kyle 
 Mirriam Manalo as Bebeth
 Juan Rodrigo as Pocholo Cuevas
 Richard Reynoso as Aldrin Ocampo
 Clara del Rosario as a receptionist
 Miguel Faustman as an auctioneer
 Lovi Poe as herself
 Kiel Rodriguez as Scott Reyes
 Dang Cruz as Lolly
 Gino Ilustre as Aurelio Vida
 Michael Roy Jornales as Dudut
 Franchesco Maafi as Ronron Vida
 Ping Medina as Jiggs
 Dexter Doria as Lorna Chua
 Nikki Co as Gino Chua
 Kleif Almeda as Ana Chua
 Jojit Lorenzo as Enzo
 Angela Alarcon as Chloe
 Zara Lopez as Greta
 Brent Valdez as a PDEA agent
 Erin Ocampo as Aleli
 Robbie Packing as Jack Chua
 Jeremy Marquez as Rex Chua / Lazarus
 Kim Last as Denver Jacinto
 Elle Ramirez as Suarez
 Angeli Bayani as Analyn Esteban
 Mia Pangyarihan as Lovely 
 Gelli de Belen as Patty
 Angelika dela Cruz as Katrina Vijandre
 Will Devaughn as Smokey
 Francis Mata as Richard Buenaseda
 Eliza Sarmiento as an attorney
 Shanicka Arganda as Ann-Ann
 Jeff Carpio as Calvin
 Allen Cecilio as an PDEA agent
 Jay Garcia as Denver
 Noa Hyun as an PDEA agent
 Rosemarie Sarita as a chairman
 Jackie Rice as Apple
 Bryan Benedict as a drug seller
 Denise Barbacena as Shine
 Glaiza de Castro as Roxy
 Diana Zubiri as Athena "Queen A" Vergara
 Louise Bolton as Mia Bermudez
 Bobby Andrews as Daryl Oliva
 Mega Unciano as Happy
 Alice Dixson as Black Rose
 Sanya Lopez as Thea Vasquez
 Diva Montelaba as Melanie
 Michael Flores as Osmond
 Cherie Gil as Diorella Peñareyes
 Chanel Morales as Dani
 Rey Soldevilla, Jr.
 Vince Vandorpe

Accolades

References

External links
 
 

2019 Philippine television series debuts
2020 Philippine television series endings
Filipino-language television shows
GMA Network drama series
Philippine action television series
Philippine crime television series
Television shows set in the Philippines